Keiko Mukaide (born 1954 in Tokyo) is a Japanese artist who lives and works Fife on the Scottish coast. She was an early winner of a Creative Scotland award and was shortlisted for the 1998 Jerwood Prize for glass.

Education 
Mukaide studied communication design at Musashino Art University in Tokyo, Japan, and received a master's degree in glass at the Royal College of Art in London.
She was awarded a research fellowship from the Edinburgh College of Art.

Artistic Style 
Her art work employs a number of glass making techniques, casting and fusing glass in a kiln, manipulating glass in a blowing studio and gluing shards of dichroic glass to wire nets.

Her recent work has been to produce large scale, site specific installations constructed from multiple small scale glass items, including "Memory of Place" funded by The Arts Council of England and Scottish Arts Council at York St. Mary's, Castlegate, York.

In 2007, Mukaide collaborated with Si Applied Ltd. on Cutting Edge, a 90 m stainless steel sculpture in Sheaf Square, Sheffield, UK. The piece was commissioned by the Sheffield City Council as part of their "Heart of the City" project, a 10-year improvement of a pedestrian route in the city. Cutting Edge received the joint Marsh Award for Public Sculpture in 2008.

Exhibitions and collections 
 Light of the North, Tate St Ives, 2006
 Spirit of Place, Talbot Rice Gallery, Edinburgh, 2003
 One Crowded Hour, collaboration with Tabula Rasa Dance Company, Scotland 2001
 Between Seen and Unseen (Miegakari), Hill House, Helensburgh, Scotland 2001
 Elemental Traces, Royal Botanic Garden Edinburgh
 Collection of The Victoria and Albert Museum, London

Awards 
 Shortlisted for the 1998 Jerwood Applied Art Prize

References

 

1954 births
People from Tokyo
Japanese artists
Japanese expatriates in the United Kingdom
Living people